Warlord was an American Christian metal band that formed in 1997. The band's sound was described as "doom hardcore", a mix between doom metal and hardcore punk. The band was signed to Solid State Records during their brief existence. Before disbanding, the band did a tour with fellow Solid State band, Training for Utopia. The band has a compilation coming out, to help drummer Timothy Henderson with his health problems. The compilation has a new song and an unreleased track from Rock the Foe Hammer.

In their tenure, the band released an EP, titled Warlord, and a debut album Rock the Foe Hammer, both of which came out through Solid State.

Members 

Last known lineup
 Ricky Rodgers – vocals, lead guitar (1997–1999, 2015) (formerly of Fuse of Ire and Catechuman)
 Phil Smith – bass (1998–1999, 2015) (World Against World)
 Timothy Henderson – drums, backing vocals (1997–1999, 2015) (formerly of Mr. Bishop's Fist and Catechuman)

Fill-in musicians
 Jonathan Ford – bass, backing vocals (1997–1998) (formerly of Roadside Monument, Catechuman and Mr. Bishop's Fist)

Former
 Brian Fletchner – rhythm guitar, backing vocals (1997–1998) (Pilgrims, AAPOAA)

Timeline

Discography
EPs
 Warlord (1997; Solid State)

Studio album
 Rock the Foe Hammer (1999; Solid State)

Compilation appearances
 "Set Sail to the Kingdom" on We Bear the Scars (2017)

References

Musical groups established in 1997
Musical groups disestablished in 1999
Solid State Records artists
Musical groups from Portland, Oregon
1997 establishments in Oregon
1999 disestablishments in Oregon